Melissa O'Neil won the title of the first female Canadian Idol and the youngest Idol in Canada in 2005, beating runner-up Rex Goudie.

Semi-finals

Semifinal Group 1 (14 June 2005)

Notes
Daryl Brunt and Ashley Leitão advanced to the top 10 of the competition. The other 6 contestants were eliminated.
Dianelys Hernandez and Stephane Aubin returned for a second chance at the top 10 in the Wildcard Round.

Semifinal Group 2 (21 June 2005)

Notes
Casey LeBlanc and Emily Vinette advanced to the top 10 of the competition. The other 6 contestants were eliminated.
Josh Palmer and Vince Benenati returned for a second chance at the top 10 in the Wildcard Round.

Semifinal Group 3 (28 June 2005)

Notes
Amber Fleury and Rex Goudie advanced to the top 10 of the competition. The other 6 contestants were eliminated.
Devika Mathur and Barrett Peitsch returned for a second chance at the top 10 in the Wildcard Round.

Semifinal Group 4 (5 July 2005)

Notes
Melissa O'Neil and Suzi Rawn advanced to the top 10 of the competition. The other 6 contestants were eliminated.
Luke O'Reilly and Aaron Walpole returned for a second chance at the top 10 in the Wildcard Round.

Wildcard (12 July 2005)

Notes
Aaron Walpole and Josh Palmer received the most votes, and completed the top 10.

Finals

Top 10 (19 July 2005)
Theme: Canadian Hits

Top 9 (26 July 2005)
Theme: Stevie Wonder

Top 8 (2 August 2005)
Theme: The 80s

Top 7 (9 August 2005)
Theme: Standards

Top 6 (16 August 2005)
Theme: Classic Rock

Top 5 (23 August 2005)
Theme: Burton Cummings & The Guess Who

Top 4 (30 August 2005)
Theme: Elvis Presley

Top 3 (6 September 2005)
Theme: The Barenaked Ladies

Top 2 (13 September 2005)

Elimination Chart

Releases
Since the Third Season of Canadian Idol, Melissa O'Neil, Rex Goudie, Aaron Walpole and Suzi Rawn have released solo albums. Casey LeBlanc, Ashley Leitao and Amber Fleury formed a trio called "Braided". Braided released their debut album "Casey, Ashley, & Amber" in 2006. They are the second music group to come from an Idol show in the world.

2005 Canadian television seasons
3
2005 in Canadian music